The 2015 Tour de Yorkshire was a cycling stage race that took place in Yorkshire in May 2015. It was the first edition of the Tour de Yorkshire and was organised by Welcome to Yorkshire and the Amaury Sport Organisation, who also organised the Yorkshire stages of the 2014 Tour de France. The race started in Bridlington on 1 May and ended in Leeds on 3 May. It included three stages and was rated as a 2.1 event as part of the 2015 UCI Europe Tour.

The first stage of the race was won by Lars Petter Nordhaug in a sprint from a small group. He kept his lead through the second stage, which ended in a bunch sprint, and was able to extend it slightly in the third and final stage of the race. He won the general classification in the race by eleven seconds. Samuel Sánchez was second and Thomas Voeckler was third. Nordhaug also won the points classification and Team Sky won the teams classification. The mountains classification was won by Nicolas Edet.

Race route 
The race was first discussed publicly in July 2014, after the first stages of the Tour de France that took place in Yorkshire. It was organised by the Amaury Sport Organisation, the organisers of the Tour de France, and Welcome to Yorkshire, who had been the organisers of the Yorkshire stages of the 2014 Tour de France. On 22 December 2014, the start and finish locations for the event were released, these were Bridlington, Leeds, Scarborough, Selby, Wakefield and York. On 21 January 2015, details of the three stages of the route were unveiled at the Bridlington Spa. The first two stages (especially the second) were expected to suit the sprinters, while the third stage was described as the "queen stage". It included several roads and climbs that had been part of the second stage of the 2014 Tour de France between York and Sheffield. The stage was rated as a 2.1 event.

There was also a women's race that took place as part of the Tour de Yorkshire event. This took place on the second day of the men's race over four laps of the  route around York that was also the final part of the men's racing that day. Lizzie Armitstead, who did not compete in the event due to a conflicting event in Europe, expressed a hope that the women's race in future would be a three-day event like the men's race. The women's race was won by Louise Mahé (Ikon–Mazda) in a sprint finish.

Teams 
18 teams were selected to take part in the inaugural Tour de Yorkshire. Five of these were UCI WorldTeams; six were UCI Professional Continental teams; six were UCI Continental teams, with the Great Britain national team completing the field. Teams could enter between five and eight riders. Fourteen teams selected eight riders and four teams selected seven; 140 riders were therefore entered into the race. One rider (Caleb Fairly of ) pulled out before the start, so the race began with a peloton of 139 riders.

Pre-race expectations 

Much of the pre-race media focused on the presence of Bradley Wiggins, Britain's first ever winner of the Tour de France, who was riding his first race for his new team, . Wiggins was not, however, expected to attempt to win the overall classification in the race; his main objective was preparing for his hour record attempt in June.

Cycling Weekly expected that the race would be dominated by "punchy all-rounders". The riders expected to perform strongly over the three days included Ben Swift, Moreno Hofland and Steven Kruijswijk (both ), Greg Van Avermaet, Thomas Voeckler and Erick Rowsell. The second stage appeared most likely to end in a sprint, with Marcel Kittel the favourite to take victory, although he had suffered an illness and had not raced since the Tour of Qatar in February. Other prominent sprinters included Swift and Hofland, as well as Matteo Pelucchi, Rick Zabel, Gerald Ciolek and Steele Von Hoff.

Stages

Stage 1 
1 May 2015 — Bridlington to Scarborough, 

The first stage of the race began in Bridlington on the North Sea coast. The riders first travelled north-east to Flamborough, where they turned to the north-west. Initially this kept them along the coast, but soon took them into the North York Moors, where the first climb was the Côte de Dalby Forest. The riders then turned to the south-west and descended to Pickering, where the first intermediate sprint was positioned. The route turned north, back onto the Moors, where they reached the Côte de Rosedale Abbey after . This was the longest climb of the day:  at 7%. The riders continued north as far as Castleton, where they turned east. After , the riders climbed the Côte de Grosmont ( at 16.9%), then the Côte de Briggswath ( at 6.2%). From here, they returned to the coast at Whitby, where there was another intermediate sprint; the riders then turned south. The final climb of the day came after ; it was the Côte de Robin Hood's Bay ( at 10.3%). The riders then continued south to the finish line in Scarborough, doing a loop around the town before finishing on the sea front. Thomas Voeckler described the stage as "much tougher than we thought" due to the small roads.

An initial breakaway was formed by Mark Christian, Loïc Chetout, Eddie Dunbar, Mark Stewart and Rasmus Quaade. They built up a five-minute lead but  chased hard; the break's lead was reduced to a few seconds by the Côte de Rosedale Abbey. A new breakaway was formed here by Perrig Quéméneur and Tim Declercq, while Marcel Kittel was dropped and abandoned the race shortly afterwards. With  remaining, the peloton descended into Egton in wet conditions. Team Sky were riding at the front of the peloton, but their riders Ben Swift and Ian Boswell, and Dunbar crashed. Dunbar suffered a broken clavicle and Swift a shoulder injury: both were forced to abandon the race.

The crucial move of the race came with  remaining as the race went through Whitby, as a 15-man group formed. This was reduced to five riders on the Côte de Robin Hood's Bay. Philip Deignan rode hard on the climb, with only Stéphane Rossetto, Samuel Sánchez, Voeckler, and Deignan's teammate Lars Petter Nordhaug able to follow him. Despite attacks on the way into Scarborough, these five riders came to the finish line together. Nordhaug won the sprint ahead of Voeckler and Rossetto. The peloton was more than a minute behind; the sprint was won by Greg Van Avermaet. Thanks to bonus seconds, Nordhaug led the race by four seconds ahead of Voeckler. He also led the points classification. The mountains classification was led by Quéméneur. Quéméneur was also awarded the combativity prize after the online vote: Dunbar won the vote, but was unable to receive the prize because he had been hospitalised, and abandoned the race, due to his crash.

Stage 2 
2 May 2015 — Selby to York, 

The second stage of the race, which was much flatter than the first and third stages, began in Selby, North Yorkshire. The stage began with an  neutralised section, which included a loop around the town centre; the racing started as the riders headed east for  towards Market Weighton. Here they turned south and climbed the first of the day's two categorised climbs; this was the Côte de North Newbald ( at 5.3%). The route again turned east and the riders reached Beverley after . From here the route turned north and entered the Yorkshire Wolds; there was an intermediate sprint as the route passed through Wetwang. Immediately after the intermediate sprint came the second climb of the day, the Côte de Fimber ( at 6.2%). The riders continued north as far as Malton, then turned south-west towards York. The race concluded in York with a  finishing circuit. They then rode two complete laps of the circuit; the race finished with the third crossing of the finish line, after .

An early breakaway of 18 riders formed. This included Philip Deignan, who had been in the winning break in the first stage and was 10 seconds off the race lead. The other teams in the peloton were not willing to let a breakaway that included Deignan go; eventually he and nine others dropped back to the main peloton. Eight riders were therefore left in the lead group: Andy Tennant, Bert De Backer, Stijn Steels, Giovanni Bernaudeau, Matt Brammeier, Nicolas Edet, Ivar Slik and Mark McNally. McNally won both categorised climbs. The break's lead was nearly seven minutes with  remaining;  and  began chasing hard and reduced the gap sharply; the breakaway had less than two minutes' lead as they entered the laps around York.

The breakaway split up; McNally and De Backer remained alone in the lead with  left. McNally was voted as the day's most combative rider through a Twitter vote, but he was unable to stay with De Backer in the final . De Backer continued alone; he was briefly joined by Loïc Chetout but the pair were unable to stay away from the chasing pack. As they were caught, with  remaining, Greg Van Avermaet attacked. Although he appeared to have a lead large enough to secure the stage victory, he ran out of energy shortly before the line and was caught by the sprinters. The first of these was Moreno Hofland, who took his team's first victory of the year, with Matteo Pelucchi second and Ramon Sinkeldam third. Due to a split in the peloton, Voeckler and Rossetto both lost six seconds. Samuel Sánchez therefore moved up into second place overall, while Nordhaug's lead increased to ten seconds.

Stage 3 
3 May 2015 — Wakefield to Leeds, '''

The third stage was the queen stage of the race and included several of the roads used in stage 2 of the 2014 Tour de France. The stage began in Wakefield, West Yorkshire, outside the city's cathedral; there was a neutralised lap of the city centre before the riders left the city to the south. The route passed through Sandal Magna and reached Barnsley after . Here the roads turned west and entered the Pennines. The first climb of the day came after : this was the Côte de Holmfirth ( at 5.5%). From here the route was twisting, though it generally travelled north as it passed to the west of Huddersfield and Halifax. The next climb, the Côte de Scapegoat Hill ( at 8.3%), came after  of racing. The riders briefly left Yorkshire for the only time in the race (the route entered Greater Manchester but immediately returned to West Yorkshire). The roads were hilly throughout, with barely any flat road. The next categorised climb was the Côte de Hebden Bridge ( at 5.5%) after  with the Côte de Goose Eye ( at 10%) shortly afterwards. After , there was an intermediate sprint in Ilkley, then the Côte de Cow and Calf ( at 8%). There was then a fairly flat  section to the finish line in Leeds, with the finish line in Roundhay Park.

The day's main breakaway was formed by Lawson Craddock, Sondre Holst Enger, Reinardt Janse van Rensburg, Nicolas Edet, James McLaughlin, Ian Bibby ( and Rasmus Quaade. Bibby won the first three climbs of the day; the group then split apart on the Côte de Goose Eye. Craddock was the first to cross the summit with only Edet able to follow him. Edet won the next two climbs and secured victory in the mountains classification.

With  remaining, the gap was about 90 seconds as 's David López, Ian Boswell and Philip Deignan led the remaining part of the peloton. Josh Edmondson (Great Britain) made an unsuccessful attack from this group. On the uncategorised climb leading up to the final sprint of the day, Craddock dropped Edet and continued alone. In the peloton, Samuel Sánchez also attacked on the climb. Nordhaug followed him and won the final bonus second, putting him more than ten seconds ahead of Sánchez. Steve Cummings and Steven Kruijswijk attacked together after the climb; they too were unsuccessful. He caught and passed Craddock  later; meanwhile  led the group without making any particular effort to chase Hermans down. Hermans took a solo victory; the 17-man group was nine seconds behind. Teammate Greg Van Avermaet won the sprint for second, with Julien Simon third. Nordhaug finished in fifth to secure victory overall and in the points classification.  also won the teams classification. Edet won the mountains classification. The final stage combativity prize was won by Bibby.

Classification leadership table 

The race included three individual classifications and a team classification. The most important of these was the general classification. This was calculated by adding up each cyclist's finishing times on each stage. Bonus seconds were awarded for top-three placings in each stage (10 seconds for the first rider, 6 seconds for the second, 4 seconds for the third) and for placings in intermediate sprints (3 seconds for the first rider, 2 seconds for the second, 1 second for the third). The rider with the lowest cumulative time after taking bonus seconds into account was the leader of the classification and was awarded a blue and yellow – colours traditionally associated with Yorkshire – jersey. The winner of the general classification was considered the winner of the race.

The second classification was the points classification. On each stage of the race, points were awarded to the top 10 riders. The winner won 15 points, with 12 for the second-placed rider, 9 for the third-placed rider, 7 for the sixth-placed rider and then one point fewer for each place down to tenth place. Points were also awarded to the top three riders at intermediate sprints, with five points for the winner of the sprint and three, and one points for the riders in second and third places respectively. The rider with the most points was the leader of the classification and was awarded a green jersey. There was also a mountains classification. Over the three stages, there were 13 categorised climbs. On each of these climbs, the first four riders to the summit were awarded points, with 5 for the first rider, 3 for the second, 2 for the third and 1 for the fourth. The rider with the most accumulated points was the leader of the classification and was awarded a dark pink jersey.

The final classification was a team classification. The team's time on each was calculated by taking the best three riders from that team and adding their times together; the team with the lowest cumulative time was the leader of the classification. Another jersey was awarded at the end of each stage. This was a combativity prize and was to be awarded to the rider who "made the greatest effort and [...] demonstrated the best qualities in terms of sportsmanship". A jury selected a list of riders to be eligible for the prize; the winner of the prize was then decided by a vote on Twitter. The rider was awarded a grey jersey.

Final classifications

General classification

Points classification

Mountains classification

Teams classification

Notes

References

Sources

External links 

 

Tour de Yorkshire
Yorkshire
Tour de Yorkshire